The Pittsburgh Line is the Norfolk Southern Railway's primary east–west artery in its Pittsburgh Division and Harrisburg Division across the U.S. state of Pennsylvania and is part of the Keystone Corridor, Amtrak-Norfolk Southern's combined rail corridor.

The Pittsburgh Line spans  between its namesake city of Pittsburgh and the state capital in Harrisburg, crossing the Allegheny Mountains through the Gallitzin Tunnels west of Altoona and the famous Horseshoe Curve in the process. Its east end connects with the railroad's Harrisburg Line to Reading and Philadelphia, and the west end connects to the Fort Wayne Line to Conway, Pennsylvania, and points west in Ohio and Indiana.

The Pittsburgh Line is arguably Norfolk Southern's busiest freight corridor, where 50 to 70 trains traverse the line daily.

History
The Pittsburgh Line was originally owned by the Pennsylvania Railroad (PRR). It began as two rail lines, the Middle Division Main Line which was part of the PRR Middle Division and the Pittsburgh Division Main Line which was part of the PRR Pittsburgh Division. The Pennsylvania Railroad combined the Middle Division Main Line and the Pittsburgh Division Main Line into one rail line, forming the Pittsburgh Line, though at the time the Pittsburgh Line was not referred to by that name. At the same time the Middle Division and the Pittsburgh Division were also combined.

The Pennsylvania Railroad eventually combined the merged Middle Division/Pittsburgh Division Main Line with their main rail line to Philadelphia, forming the Main Line of the Pennsylvania Railroad (now known as the Keystone Corridor). The Main Line served as the PRR's primary route across Pennsylvania, continuing its existence through the Penn Central years and the early years of Conrail.

Conrail broke the PRR Main Line into two rail lines again, reestablishing the Pittsburgh Line and the PRR Philadelphia main line which eventually became known as the Philadelphia to Harrisburg Main Line, now under the ownership of Amtrak. The Pittsburgh Line received its current name in the 1980s under Conrail.

The Pittsburgh Line was passed down to the Norfolk Southern Railway in 1999 during the breakup of Conrail between Norfolk Southern and CSX Transportation.

Major terminals
The Pittsburgh Line is marked with three major freight terminals at its ends. On its east end, Harrisburg Terminal handles the bulk of the railroad's intermodal traffic, with a handful of intermodal trains originating and terminating there. Across the Susquehanna River in Enola is Norfolk Southern's major freight terminal in the Greater Harrisburg area: Enola Yard, which handles almost all manifest freight traffic that passes through the area. Many of the Pittsburgh Line's manifest freight trains originate or terminate here, with a few continuing south to Baltimore and points east, while others bypass Enola and cross the Rockville Bridge over the Susquehanna to Harrisburg bound for Allentown and points east.

On its west end, the Pittsburgh Line becomes the Fort Wayne Line after crossing the Allegheny River bridge, where trains travel  to reach Conway Yard. Conway is the hub of activity in Western Pennsylvania, where many trains originate and terminate, with many of those trains being the same freight trains that originate and terminate at Enola Yard, respectively. Conway is the hub of operations for Norfolk Southern in the Greater Pittsburgh area, featuring a hump yard and a crew change point for virtually all Pittsburgh and Fort Wayne Line trains.

Routing

From Harrisburg/Enola, the railroad travels northwest following the path of the Susquehanna River parallel to U.S. Route 11/15, passing through the communities of Marysvile, Cove, and Duncannon. At Duncannon, the Pittsburgh Line leaves the Susquehanna and follows the path of the smaller Juniata River, which it will follow for much of its length to Altoona. This segment is unofficially dubbed the "Middle Division", after the Pittsburgh Line's predecessor, the Middle Division Main Line which was part of the Pennsylvania Railroad (PRR) Middle Division. U.S. Route 22 follows the route for much of its length here. Once at Altoona, the railroad arrives at the base of the Allegheny Mountain Front, which it must climb to reach Johnstown and Pittsburgh.

Altoona is the site of the Norfolk Southern (NS)'s Juniata Shops, the largest locomotive repair facility on the NS system. Originally constructed by the PRR in 1850, this large complex of shops is what gave the city of Altoona its worth and structure.

Leaving Altoona, the railroad travels at a 1.76% grade up the east slope of the Alleghenies, negotiating the famous Horseshoe Curve during that climb. From Johnstown, the Pittsburgh Line follows the path of the Conemaugh River on both of its banks to Conpit Junction, where the line divides. Westbound and lighter eastbound trains take the again-graded Pittsburgh Line west towards Pittsburgh, while heavier eastbound trains take the Conemaugh Line on an easier routing from Pittsburgh, which continues to follow the Conemaugh River. The Conemaugh Line joins back in with the Pittsburgh Line at CP-PENN in Pittsburgh. The line's westernmost end is at CP-WEST PITT by Pittsburgh's Amtrak station, where it crosses the Allegheny River to form the Fort Wayne Line.

Allegheny Mountains and Horseshoe Curve

Until reaching Altoona, the Pittsburgh Line is a double-track mainline from Duncannon. Once at Altoona, a third track is added for the climb up the Allegheny Mountains. The line goes back to two at Conpit Junction, where the Conemaugh Line remains a single-track route.

On the east slope of the Alleghenies, the tracks traverse remote mountainous terrain at a grade of about 1.8%. Roughly halfway up the westward ascent lies the Horseshoe Curve. Originally constructed by the PRR in 1854, the 220-degree curve was the solution for the railroad to gain enough elevation around a valley to reach the higher land across to continue west. Constructed mainly by immigrants, the curve was built by cutting into the hillside around Kittanning Point and filling in the necessary places for the railroad right-of-way to be laid. Today, the curve functions as a tourist attraction for both railroad enthusiasts and the rest of the public, and is a magnet for drawing visitors from all over the globe. It is listed on the National Register of Historic Places, and boasts a visitors park in the apex of the curve adjacent to the Pittsburgh Line tracks, as well as a visitors center and gift shop.

Past the curve, the Pittsburgh Line continues west to Gallitzin, passing through MG Interlocking a mile west of Horseshoe Curve, whose old PRR interlocking tower is also on the historic register, though off-limits to the public. East of Gallitzin, the railroad passes through Bennington Curve, the site of a PRR passenger wreck in 1947 killing 16 people and injuring over 100. Past Bennington Curve at a railroad timetable station called "SF", the three tracks split. Both sets of main tracks pass through tunnels to exit and crest in the town of Gallitzin. Tracks 2 and 3 pass through the new Allegheny Tunnel, while Track 1 passes through the New Portage Tunnel. A third tunnel can be seen; the Gallitzin Tunnel, which used to house Track 3 before the Allegheny Tunnel was heightened and widened to house Tracks 2 and 3 as well as doublestack container traffic on intermodal trains in 1994. Upon its completion in 1995, the Gallitzin Tunnel was officially closed.

Past Gallitzin, the railroad passes through the small town of Cresson, where all of the Pittsburgh Line's tracks come back together. Here is also where a locomotive helper base is located, as well as interchange(s) with the RJ Corman Railroad. Also located in Cresson is the Station Inn, a bed and breakfast run exclusively for railroad enthusiasts, which features a long sheltered porch showing a close and clear view of the Pittsburgh Line tracks.

Past Cresson, the railroad passes down the Alleghenies' west slope, through the towns of Lilly, Cassandra, Portage, Wilmore, Summerhill, South Fork, Mineral Point, Parkhill, and East Conemaugh before reaching Johnstown at the bottom of the mountain. South Fork is the junction of the South Fork Secondary, a coal route used to reach local mines in the area which generates a train or two a day bound for various destinations.

Helpers

Helper locomotives are used by Norfolk Southern to assist heavy trains over mountainous portions of the Pittsburgh Line. Helper crews are mainly based in Altoona and Conemaugh/Johnstown, though some helpers are called as far away as Pittsburgh. For many years, EMD SD40-2 locomotives held down pusher duties in the Altoona Helper Pool until 2009, when newer SD40E locomotives constructed by Juniata began to phase out the older locomotive models. The SD40E's finally filled the ranks of the SD40-2's in the summer of 2010. The latter are known as "4-Bangers" on the mountain by local railfans. In late 2019, Norfolk Southern began bringing in SD70ACUs to replace the previous SD40E fleet. In April 2020, nearly 50% of Altoona's helpers are SD70ACUs.

Passenger operations

Today, a pair of Amtrak passenger trains is the only passenger service that remains on the Pittsburgh Line. Amtrak's Pennsylvanian trains make the following Pennsylvania station stops on the Pittsburgh Line: Harrisburg, Lewistown, Huntingdon, Tyrone, Altoona, Johnstown, Latrobe, Greensburg, and Pittsburgh.

In May 2013 the Commonwealth of Pennsylvania agreed to US$3.8 million in funding to subsidize the passenger line.

See also
Conemaugh Line, a low-grade alternate route between Johnstown and Pittsburgh
Port Perry Branch, used (together with part of the Mon Line) as a high-clearance alternate route between Wilmerding and Pittsburgh
List of Norfolk Southern Railway lines

References 

 http://parailfan.com
 http://www.northeast.railfan.net/horseshoe.html
 https://web.archive.org/web/20120426051916/http://www.swparails.com/gallery/v/Conway+Yard/
 http://www.gallitzin.info/tunnels.php
 http://www.billspennsyphotos.com/apps/photos/photo?photoid=78124230
 http://www.altoonaworks.info/history.html

 
Norfolk Southern Railway lines
Rail infrastructure in Pennsylvania
Pennsylvania Railroad lines